McKee City is an unincorporated community located within the Mays Landing section of Hamilton Township, Atlantic County, New Jersey, United States. The community was named after Colonel John McKee (1821–1902), an African American property speculator. Although its name includes the word "city", McKee City is not an actual city — it is currently a crossroads of commerce that has replaced tenant farmers with retail stores and residential neighborhoods.

McKee City was the site of the former Atlantic City Race Course, and is home to numerous commercial businesses, including the Hamilton Mall, which opened in 1987.

Demographics

History
McKee City was founded by Colonel John McKee in 1884. It was originally a farming community, along with a sawmill, a schoolhouse, a general store, a community hall, and several farms near the former Pennsylvania-Reading Railroad (currently the site of the Black Horse Pike). Colonel McKee intended to build a  planned community where African Americans from the south could settle after the Civil War. A number of dormitory-type houses were built without frills like inside plumbing or heating.
Leases were carefully designed to ensure that the tenants improved the land. The Colonel had great plans for this settlement, but he died before they could all be realized.

Upon his death, Colonel McKee made a bequest of $2 million (equivalent to $ million in ), to be administered by the Archdiocese of Philadelphia headed by Archbishop Patrick John Ryan, to be partly used "to build a Catholic church, rectory and convent in McKee City..." However, the will was disputed by McKee's family, the funds were not distributed, and the facilities Colonel McKee envisioned were not built.

References

African-American history of New Jersey
Hamilton Township, Atlantic County, New Jersey
Unincorporated communities in Atlantic County, New Jersey
Unincorporated communities in New Jersey
African-American Roman Catholicism